The Rush Hour is a 1928 American silent comedy film directed by E. Mason Hopper and starring Marie Prevost, Harrison Ford and Seena Owen.

Cast
 Marie Prevost as Margie Dolan  
 Harrison Ford as Dan Morley  
 Seena Owen as Yvonne Dorée  
 David Butler as William Finch  
 Ward Crane as Dunrock  
 Arthur Hoyt as Professor Jones 
 Wilson Benge as Travel Agent  
 Mathilde Comont as Chanteuse at Bohemia Cafe  
 William Irving as Seasick Shipboard Passenger  
 Franklin Pangborn as Troublemaker at Bohemia Cafe

Preservation status
The film has been preserved at UCLA Film & Television Archive.

References

Bibliography
 Richard Lewis Ward. When the Cock Crows: A History of the Pathé Exchange. SIU Press, 2016.

External links

 lantern slide(archived)

1928 films
1928 comedy films
Silent American comedy films
Films directed by E. Mason Hopper
American silent feature films
1920s English-language films
American black-and-white films
Pathé Exchange films
1920s American films